The list of shipwrecks in 1969 includes ships sunk, foundered, grounded, or otherwise lost during 1969.

January

5 January

6 January

9 January

12 January

31 January

Unknown date

February

1 February

6 February

9 February

10 February

11 February

12 February

13 February

16 February

24 February

March

1 March

8 March

11 March

19 March

21 March

25 March

26 March

28 March

29 March

Unknown date

April

3 April

4 April

6 April

11 April

18 April

29 April

Unknown date

May

1 May

7 May

10 May

15 May

20 May

23 May

26 May

27 May

Unknown date

June

3 June

7 June

16 June

17 June

19 June

20 June

24 June

25 June

26 June

27 June

28 June

29 June

July

4 July

10 July

16 July

19 July

20 July

21 July

25 July

Unknown date

August

1 August

2 August

8 August

9 August

17 August

18 August

22 August

25 August

26 August

29 August

September

1 September

6 September

16 September

22 September

23 September

Unknown date

October

1 October

2 October

4 October

7 October

8 October

10 October

14 October

28 October

31 October

Unknown date

November

1 November

4 November

5 November

6 November

7 November

8 November

11 November

19 November

22 November

27 November

Unknown date

December

5 December

14 December

15 December

16 December

19 December

25 December

26 December

28 December

29 December

30 December

Unknown date

References

See also 

1969
 
Ships